Meet Peters & Lee was a British television series aired in 1976. It was produced by Associated Television (ATV) and aired on ITV. All six episodes are believed to have been destroyed. There was also a christmas edition for 1974. Also missing.

References

External links
Meet Peters & Lee on IMDb

1976 British television series debuts
1976 British television series endings
Lost television shows
English-language television shows
1970s British music television series